Altid Sammen is the fifth studio album by Danish band Efterklang. It was released on 20 September 2019 under 4AD in the UK and US, and their own label Rumraket in Europe.

Critical reception
Altid Sammen was met with "generally favorable" reviews from critics. At Metacritic, which assigns a weighted average rating out of 100 to reviews from mainstream publications, this release received an average score of 69, based on 8 reviews. Aggregator Album of the Year gave the album a 69 out of 100 based on a critical consensus of 8 reviews. AnyDecentMusic? reviewed the release at 6.7 out of 10.

Track listing

Release history

Charts

References

2019 albums
Efterklang albums
4AD albums